George Saliba (Arabic: جورج صليبا) is a Lebanese-American Professor of Arabic and Islamic Science at the Department of Middle Eastern, South Asian, and African Studies, Columbia University, New York, USA, where he has been since 1979. Saliba is currently the founding director of the Farouk Jabre Center for Arabic & Islamic Science & Philosophy and the 
Jabre-Khwarizmi Chair in the History Department.

Career
Saliba has been at Columbia University since 1979. He received a bachelors and master's degree in mathematics from the American University of Beirut. After, he received a master of science degree in Semitic languages and a doctorate in Islamic sciences from the University of California at Berkeley. He has won the History of Science Prize given by the Third World Academy of Science in 1993, and the History of Astronomy Prize in 1996 from the Kuwait Foundation for the Advancement of Science. In 2005 he was named as a Senior Distinguished Scholar at the John W. Kluge Center.

Research on aspects of the history of Islamic science 
Saliba studies the development of scientific ideas from late antiquity till early modern times, with a special focus on the various planetary theories that were developed within the Islamic civilization and the impact of such theories on early European astronomy. He uncovered pathways of transmission of Islamic astronomy to Renaissance Europe. The main thrust of his research has been the connections between Islamic astronomers and Copernicus.  His  book "Islamic Science and the Making of the European Renaissance" has been published in multiple languages including Arabic, English, and Turkish.

Columbia Unbecoming
Saliba was one of the professors named in the 2004 Columbia Unbecoming controversy as allegedly being intimidating or unfair to students with pro-Israel views. A student of his, Lindsay Shrier, claimed that he told her that those with green eyes (like herself) are not racial "Semites", and have no valid national claim to Middle Eastern lands. Saliba claims that this is a fabrication. Saliba rejected the accusation and published a rebuttal in Columbia Spectator on 3 November 2004 to that effect.

Bibliography
 Islamic Science and the Making of the European Renaissance, MIT Press (April 1, 2007)  (hardcover, and in paperback as of 2011. The book has since been translated into Turkish, Arabic, Urdu and Bahasa (Indonesian)
 A History of Arabic Astronomy: Planetary Theories During the Golden Age of Islam, New York, University Press; (1994)  (hardcover); (reissue edition: November 1995)  (paperback)
 (With Linda Komaroff, Catherine Hess) The Arts of Fire : Islamic Influences on Glass and Ceramics of the Italian Renaissance, Getty Trust Publications: J. Paul Getty Museum (June 10, 2004),  (hardcover)
 "The Crisis of the Abbasid Caliphate" (Tabari, Ta'rikh Al-Rusul Wa'l-Muluk; annotated translation), State University of New York Press (November 1985)  (Hardcover),  (paperback)
 "The Astronomical Work of Mu’ayyad al-Din al-’Urdi (died 1266): A Thirteenth Century Reform of Ptolemaic Astronomy", Markaz dirasat al-Wahda al-'Arabiya, Beirut, 1990, 1995
 (With Sharon Gibbs) Planispheric astrolabes from the National Museum of American History, Smithsonian Institution Press, (1984)  (paperback)
 
 "The Ash'arites and the Science of the Stars" in Richard G. Hovannisian and George Sabagh (eds.), Religion and Culture in Medieval Islam (Cambridge: Cambridge University Press, 1999), 79-92.

References

External links
George Saliba's home page at columbia.edu
Daily Times report on seminar at Pakistan's Government College University

American Islamic studies scholars
Columbia University faculty
Historians of science
Living people
Lebanese emigrants to the United States
20th-century Lebanese historians
1939 births
21st-century Lebanese historians